Free the Bees is the second album from British band The Bees in 2004. Their first release for Virgin Records, it is also the first album to feature the current sextet that evolved during the tour that promoted debut album Sunshine Hit Me.

The album was originally planned to be recorded in Butler's shed (the same one where Sunshine Hit Me was produced). However, the band decided to record it at the famous Abbey Road Studios, bringing a more slick and uptempo sound than their debut.

"Chicken Payback" was released as a single in April 2005 and reached No. 28 in the UK Singles Chart.
It was used in a UK television advert for Sure Deodorant For Men during the 2006 World Cup and was subsequently used in adverts for Age UK.

Track listing
"These Are the Ghosts" (The Bees) – 3:08
"Wash in the Rain" (The Bees, Julian Batley) – 3:38
"No Atmosphere" (The Bees) – 3:48
"Horsemen" (The Bees) – 3:27
"Chicken Payback" (The Bees) – 3:12
"The Russian" (The Bees) – 5:36
"I Love You" (The Bees) – 4:35
"The Start" (The Bees) – 2:19
"Hourglass" (The Bees, Julian Batley) – 4:45
"Go Karts" (The Bees) – 3:43
"One Glass of Water" (The Bees) – 2:41
"This Is the Land" (The Bees) – 3:01

US version bonus tracks
"It Isn't Exact" (Demo)
"These Are The Ghosts" (Undead Version)

Japanese version bonus track
"Nothin" (Live)

Personnel
Kris Birkin – guitar, vocals
Paul Butler – lead vocals, guitar, piano, saxophone, trumpet, clarinet, mandolin, drums, percussion, producer
Michael Clevett – drums, percussion, bass, Hammond organ, vocals
Warren Hampshire – Hammond organ, piano, celeste, acoustic guitar, percussion, vocals
Aaron Fletcher – bass, guitar, piano, drums, percussion, vocals
Tim Parkin – vocals, trumpet, bass, piano, Rhodes piano, percussion

References

2004 albums
The Bees (band) albums
Astralwerks albums